William Stone, 3rd Proprietary Governor of Province of Maryland (c. 1603 – c. 1660) was an early English settler in Maryland. He was governor of the colony of Maryland from 1649 to 1655.

Early life
William Stone was born in Northamptonshire, England.

Business dealings in Virginia Colony
On September 15, 1619, William Stone set sail for the Virginia Colony, on the ship, Margaret of Bristol and was one of the new colonists, being sent to Berkeley Hundred, to work under Captain John Woodlief's supervision. Stone was supposed to serve the Society of Berkeley Hundred's investors for six years in exchange for 30 acres of land.  Sometime, prior to February 9, 1629, he received a tobacco bill from Richard Wheeler. By June 4, 1635, William had patented 1,800 acres in Accomack.

Family, marriage, and colonial government official

Local court records revealed, that he was the brother of Andrew Stone and Captain John Stone, who had been trading, on the Eastern Shore, since 1626. By 1634, William Stone had become a commissioner of the county court. Sometime, prior to February 1636, he married Verlinda Graves, the daughter of Captain Thomas Graves. William went on to become sheriff and vestryman. In 1645 he was residing on the Eastern Shore, in what had become Northampton County. 

By 1648, he had become the third proprietary governor of Maryland.

First Puritan settlement in Virginia
Stone came to America, in 1619, with a group of Puritans, who settled on the Eastern shore, of Chesapeake Bay, in the colony of Virginia. The first Puritan settlement, in Virginia, thrived, but eventually came into conflict with the established Episcopal Church.

In 1648, William Stone reached an agreement, with Cecilius Calvert, the 2nd Lord Baltimore to resettle the Virginia Puritan colonists, in the central region of the Province of Maryland.

Governor of Province of Maryland
On August 8, 1648, Lord Baltimore named Stone the Governor of his colony. He was the first Protestant Governor. The Assembly sought a confirmation of their religious liberty and in 1649 Governor Stone signed the Religious Toleration Act, which permitted liberty to all Christian denominations.

In 1649, William Stone and Puritan exiles, from Virginia, founded the town of Providence, now Annapolis, Maryland, on the north shore, of the Severn River and across from, the future site of, the Maryland state capital of Annapolis.

In 1654, after the Third English Civil War (1649–51), the victorious, Parliamentary forces assumed control of Maryland and Stone went into exile in Virginia. Per orders from Lord Baltimore, Stone returned the following spring at the head of a Cavalier force. But, in what is known as the Battle of the Severn (March 25, 1655), Stone was defeated and taken prisoner. 

William Stone was later replaced as Governor by Josias Fendall (1628–87), and took no further part in public affairs.

Post-governor years
William Stone wrote his will on December 3, 1659, and it was proved in Charles County, Maryland, on December 21, 1660.  Verlinda Graves Stone wrote her will, on March 3, 1674-5 and the will was proved, on July 13, 1675, in Charles County.

Restoration, land grant, and death
In 1660, the monarchy in England and the proprietor's government in Maryland were restored. Lord Baltimore granted William Stone as much land as he could ride, by horseback, in a day, as a reward for Stone's faithful service. Stone concentrated on developing his plantation at Poynton Manor in what is now Charles County, Maryland, where he died in about 1660.

Legacy
Stone's great-grandson, David (born 1709), greatly expanded the value of the estate at Poynton and returned the family to prominence. William Stone's great-great-grandsons made major contributions to the foundation of Maryland as an American state: Thomas Stone signed the Declaration of Independence, Michael Jenifer Stone represented Maryland in the First United States Congress, John Hoskins Stone was Governor of Maryland 1794–97, and William Murray Stone was the Episcopal Bishop of Baltimore. A great-great-great grandson, Barton W. Stone, was a prominent early leader of the Restoration Movement.

See also
List of colonial governors of Maryland
Proprietary Governor
Province of Maryland
English Interregnum
English Civil War
The Protectorate

References

External links

Battle of the Severn
William Stone papers at the University of Maryland Libraries

1603 births
1660 deaths
17th-century American people
American Puritans
Colonial Governors of Maryland
People of colonial Maryland
People from Northamptonshire
Puritanism in Maryland
Stone family